Army East Prussia (Armeeoberkommando Ostpreußen, abbreviated AOK Ostpreußen) was created from the AOK 2nd Army and also absorbed the remnants of the 4th Army on 7 April 1945. AOK Ostpreußen controlled all the troops in East Prussia and West Prussia. After the loss of Gdańsk (then: Danzig) and Gdynia (then: Gotenhafen) in the East Prussian Offensive the army had been isolated in the Bay of Gdansk.

Commanding officers

Commander-in-Chief

Chief of the General Staff
Generalmajor Robert Macher

1st Operations officer
 Oberstleutnant i.G. Wolfgang Brennecke

Composition 
VI Corps (General Horst Großmann)
XXVI Corps (General Gerhard Matzky) 
Generalkommando Hela
XXIII Corps (General Walter Melzer)
LV Corps / 'Fortress Pillau' (Lieutenant-General Kurt Chill) 
IX Corps (General Rolf Wuthmann)
XVIII Mountain Corps (General Friedrich Hochbaum)
102. Infanterie-Division
Division z.b.V. 607
10. Radfahr-Jäger-Brigade

References

External links
Lexikon der Wehrmacht

E
Military units and formations established in 1945
Military units and formations disestablished in 1945